Jo-Anne Barnes (born 24 December 1954) is an Australian former breaststroke swimmer. She competed in two events at the 1968 Summer Olympics.

References

External links
 

1954 births
Living people
Australian female breaststroke swimmers
Olympic swimmers of Australia
Swimmers at the 1968 Summer Olympics
Sportswomen from Queensland
20th-century Australian women
21st-century Australian women